Viscaria vulgaris, the sticky catchfly or clammy campion, is a flowering plant in the family Caryophyllaceae.

The leaves are lanceolate. The flowers, which are 20 mm across and bright rosy-pink, appear in long whorled spikes from May to August. It grows on cliffs and rocky places. In Central Europe, Lychnis viscaria can be found in a variety of habitats, such as dry meadows, lush grasslands, stony slopes, rocky outcrops of hilly terrain, and open or sparse canopied forests. It has taken over vineyards and roadside vegetation, and farming methods that preserve open vegetation are advantageous to it.

The Latin name Viscaria means "sticky", and refers to the stickiness of the stem just below the leaf joints. The English common names reference the same feature.

Viscaria vulgaris is also grown as an ornamental garden plant. In British horticultural literature it is often referred to by its synonym Lychnis viscaria. Bumblebees are considered as main pollinators of this species. The cultivar 'Splendens Plena', a double-flowered form, has won the Royal Horticultural Society’s Award of Garden Merit.

References

Garden plants
Flora of Great Britain